Brevibacterium is a genus of bacteria of the order Micrococcales. They are Gram-positive soil organisms.

Species
Brevibacterium comprises the following species:

 B. album Tang et al. 2008

 B. ammoniilyticum Kim et al. 2013
 B. anseongense Jung et al. 2019
 B. antiquum Gavrish et al. 2005
 B. atlanticum Pei et al. 2022
 B. aurantiacum Gavrish et al. 2005
 "B. aureum" Seghal Kiran et al. 2010
 B. avium Pascual and Collins 1999
 B. casei Collins et al. 1983
 B. celere Ivanova et al. 2004

 B. daeguense Cui et al. 2013

 B. epidermidis Collins et al. 1983

 B. hankyongi Choi et al. 2018

 "B. ihuae" Valles et al. 2018

 B. iodinum (ex Davis 1939) Collins et al. 1981
 B. jeotgali Choi et al. 2013
 "B. ketoglutamicum" Stackebrandt and Woese 1981

 B. limosum Pei et al. 2022
 B. linens (Wolff 1910) Breed 1953 (Approved Lists 1980)

 B. luteolum corrig. Wauters et al. 2003

 B. marinum Lee 2008

 B. mcbrellneri McBride et al. 1994
 "B. metallicus" Roman-Ponce et al. 2015
 "B. methylicum" Nesvera et al. 1991
 B. oceani Bhadra et al. 2008
 B. otitidis Pascual et al. 1996

 B. paucivorans Wauters et al. 2001
 B. permense Gavrish et al. 2005
 B. picturae Heyrman et al. 2004

 "B. pigmentatum" Pei et al. 2021
 B. pityocampae Kati et al. 2010
 B. profundi Pei et al. 2020

 B. ravenspurgense Mages et al. 2009
 "B. renqingii" Yan et al. 2021
 B. rongguiense Deng et al. 2020

 B. salitolerans Guan et al. 2010
 B. samyangense Lee 2006
 B. sandarakinum Kämpfer et al. 2010
 B. sanguinis Wauters et al. 2004

 B. sediminis Chen et al. 2016
 B. senegalense Kokcha et al. 2013
 B. siliguriense Kumar et al. 2013

 B. yomogidense Tonouchi et al. 2013

Further reading
Mimura, Haruo (September 2014). "Growth Enhancement of the Halotolerant "Brevibacterium" sp JCM 6894 by Methionine Externally Added to a Chemically Defined Medium". Biocontrol Science 19 (3): 151–155.

References

Micrococcales
Soil biology
Bacteria genera